4 Ursae Majoris (sometimes abbreviated 4 Uma) is the Flamsteed designation of a star in the northern circumpolar constellation of Ursa Major. It also bears the Bayer designation of Pi2 Ursae Majoris (Pi2 UMa, π2 Ursae Majoris, π2 UMa) and is traditionally named Muscida. With an apparent visual magnitude of +4.6, this star is visible from suburban or darker skies based upon the Bortle Dark-Sky Scale. , one extrasolar planet has been confirmed to be orbiting the star.

Properties
This star has a stellar classification of K2 III, indicating that, at an estimated age of around four billion years, it is an evolved star that has reached the giant stage. It has a mass about 1.2 times larger than the Sun, but has expanded to 18 times the Sun's girth. This heat gives it the cool, orange-hued glow of a K-type star.

Pi2 Ursae Majoris is a member of the Milky Way galaxy's thin disk population.

Planetary system 
Based upon observed radial velocity changes in the star, in 2007 the presence of a planetary companion was announced. The planet, designated 4 Ursae Majoris b, is at least seven times more massive than Jupiter. Its orbit is eccentric, orbiting 4 Ursae Majoris at 87% the distance from Sun to Earth. Compared to the Sun, this star has a lower abundance of elements other than hydrogen and helium, what astronomers term the star's metallicity. This is curious, because most main-sequence stars with planets tend to have a higher abundance of metals.

Naming and etymology
With π1, σ1, σ2, ρ, A and d, it composed the Arabic asterism Al Ṭhibā᾽, the Gazelle. According to the catalogue of stars in the Technical Memorandum 33-507 - A Reduced Star Catalog Containing 537 Named Stars, Al Ṭhibā were the title for seven stars: A as Althiba I, π1 as Althiba II, this star (π2) as Althiba III, ρ as Althiba IV, σ1 as Althiba V, σ2 as Althiba VI, and d as Althiba VII.

See also 
 47 Ursae Majoris
 Omicron Ursae Majoris
 Pi Ursae Majoris

References

External links 
 

Ursae Majoris, Pi2
Ursae Majoris, 04
073108
042527
3403
Ursa Major (constellation)
K-type giants
Althiba III
Durchmusterung objects